Bǎotíng Li and Miao Autonomous County is an autonomous county in Hainan, China. One of the six autonomous counties on the island, its postal code is 572300.

History 
The area has been referred to as Baoting since at least the Ming dynasty. Baoting was first incorporated as a county in 1935.

Baoting fell under control of the People's Liberation Army in February 1948.

Climate

Administrative divisions 
The autonomous county administers one residential community, six towns, and three townships.

Residential communities 
The autonomous county directly administers one residential community, which are typically governed by township-level divisions: Xinxing Community.

Towns 
The autonomous county administers the following six towns:

 Baocheng
 
 
 
 
 

Townships 
The autonomous county administers the following three townships:

 
 
 

Demographics 
As of 2020, Baoting's population totaled about 168,000. In 1999 the county had a population of 155,575, largely made up of the indigenous Li people and Miao people.

62.4% of the autonomous county's population is ethnically Li, 30.2% is ethnically Han, 4.5% is ethnically Miao, and 2.9% belong to other ethnic groups.

Economy 
The autonomous county's gross domestic product totaled 5.627 billion renminbi (RMB) as of 2020. As of 2020, urban residents have an annual per capita disposable income of 33,564 RMB, a figure which totaled 14,067 RMB for rural residents; these figures grew by 3.2% and 8.8% in 2020, respectively.

Baoting has a large agricultural sector, and crops grown in the autonomous county include rambutan, mangosteen, katuk, okra, and passion fruit.

See also

 List of administrative divisions of Hainan

References

External links
 Official website (Chinese)

Baitong Li and Miao Autonomous County
Li autonomous counties
Miao autonomous counties